Girl Unknown is a 2023 Spanish thriller film directed by Pablo Maqueda which stars Laia Manzanares and Manolo Solo alongside Eva Llorach. It is an adaptation of Paco Bezerra's stage play Grooming.

Plot 
The plot tracks the developments upon the physical meeting of catfishing adult Leo and young girl Carolina in a park after they get acquainted with each other in an online chat.

Cast

Production 
The film was produced by Elamedia and Fórmula Cine AIE with support from ICAA, the Madrid regional administration, Ayuntamiento de Madrid, Castilla–La Mancha's Fundación IMPULSA and ECAM, and participation of Telemadrid and CMM TV. Filming locations included Madrid and Albacete. Shooting lasted from October to November 2021.

Release 
The film was presented in the official selection of the 26th Málaga Film Festival on 17 March 2023. Distributed by Filmax, it is scheduled to be released theatrically in Spain on 9 June 2023.

Reception 
Andrea G. Bermejo of Cinemanía billed the film as the "most perverse" of Málaga's official selection, hailing Solo's performance as a sexual predator as his best ever.

Víctor A. Gómez of La Opinión de Málaga assessed that the film is "too much enamored of the purported psychological murkiness of its story and its protagonists", and it fails to meet the hype.

See also 
 List of Spanish films of 2023

References 

2023 psychological thriller films
Spanish psychological thriller films
2020s Spanish-language films
2020s Spanish films
Films shot in Madrid
Films shot in Castilla–La Mancha
Spanish films based on plays